State Secretariat Service, often abbreviated to as SSS, is the civil service under Group A and Group B state service of Government of Uttar Pradesh responsible for providing a permanent bureaucratic set up which assists in establishment and administration, policy formulation and monitoring and review of the implementation of policies/schemes of various departments.

Recruitment 
The recruitment to the service is made on the basis of an annual competitive examination conducted by Uttar Pradesh Public Service Commission. One-third of PSS quota is filled by promotion from Section Officers' cadre. PSS officers, regardless of their mode of entry, are appointed by the Governor of Uttar Pradesh.

Responsibilities of PSS officer 
The typical functions performed by a PSS officer are:
 To handle the administration and daily proceedings of the government, including formulation and implementation of policy in consultation with the minister-in-charge, additional chief secretary/principal secretary and secretary of the concerned department.

Career progression 
After completing their training, a PSS officer generally serves as under secretary in state secretariat in all departments. After that, they get promoted as deputy secretary. Later they get further promotion as joint secretary. Subsequently, they get promoted and retire as special secretary.

Salary structure

See also 
 Provincial Civil Service (Uttar Pradesh)
 Provincial Forest Service (Uttar Pradesh)
 Provincial Police Service (Uttar Pradesh)
 Provincial Finance and Accounts Service (Uttar Pradesh)
 Provincial Rural Development Service (Uttar Pradesh)
 Provincial Transport Service (Uttar Pradesh)

References 

Civil Services of Uttar Pradesh
1986 establishments in Uttar Pradesh